"The Trip" is a song written and recorded by American singer-songwriter Kim Fowley. It first appeared on the A-side of Fowley's debut single as a solo artist, which was released in early 1965 on Corby Records (see 1965 in music). Anticipating the surreal essence of psychedelia, and his early work with the Mothers of Invention, "The Trip" remains one of Fowley's most experimental compositions of his recording career. Lyrically, the song is regarded as one of the earliest recordings to explicitly make references to LSD.

In the composition, Fowley, with a lascivious tone, encourages those depressed with the world to escape it by taking LSD, pronouncing "Summertime's here, kiddies, and it's time to take a trip! To take trips!". The contents become more bizarre as he describes hallucinogenic visions of animals, and drug-induced seduction. Remarkably, despite "The Trip"'s unusual arrangement, it became a regional hit in Los Angeles, and was covered by noted deejay Godfrey in 1966, and by The Fire Escape in 1967. An advertisement in a November 1965 edition of the Los Angeles Free Press promoting the remaining copies of "The Trip" suggest the single was one of the earliest works to obviously speak about the psychedelic experience. Since its initial pressing, the song has appeared most notably on Pebbles, Volume 1 and the 1998 expanded box-set of Nuggets: Original Artyfacts from the First Psychedelic Era, 1965–1968. Godfrey's rendition, retitled "Let's Take a Trip", is featured on Pebbles, Volume 3.

The track was featured on the soundtrack for the 2008 film RocknRolla by director Guy Ritchie.

References

1965 songs
Songs about drugs
Songs written by Kim Fowley